Elk Lakes may refer to:
Elk Lakes (British Columbia), Canada
Elk Lakes Provincial Park, the provincial park surrounding the lakes
Elk Lakes cabin, an alpine hut near the lakes.

See also
Elk Lake (disambiguation)